Wensleydale is a valley or dale in the Yorkshire Dales, England. 

Wensleydale may also refer to:

 Wensleydale cheese, a style of cheese originally produced in Wensleydale, North Yorkshire
 Wensleydale (sheep), a sheep breed
 Wensleydale Railway, a railway line running through Wensleydale, England
 Baron Wensleydale (disambiguation), two baronies
 The Wensleydale School, a coeducational school in North Yorkshire, England
 Wensleydale, Victoria, a locality in Australia
 Wensleydale railway line (Australia), a line which served Wensleydale, Victoria between 1890 and 1948
 President Wensley Dale, a fictional character in the British TV-series Rastamouse